is a Japanese former swimmer who competed in the 1996 Summer Olympics.

References

1973 births
Living people
Japanese male freestyle swimmers
Japanese male butterfly swimmers
Olympic swimmers of Japan
Swimmers at the 1996 Summer Olympics
Asian Games medalists in swimming
Asian Games gold medalists for Japan
Medalists at the 1994 Asian Games
Swimmers at the 1994 Asian Games